Harry "Opie" Winston is a fictional character on the FX television series Sons of Anarchy, played by Ryan Hurst. He is a member of the Sons of Anarchy Motorcycle Club, the son of SAMCRO co-founder Piney, a member of SAMCRO, and best friend of Jax since childhood.

Character biography
Opie's mother took him away from Piney and Charming when he was sixteen, but he left her and returned to his father and the club.

Season 1

While married to Donna, Opie is sent to prison for five years, after being caught by police when his getaway driver (Kyle Hobart) abandoned him at a crime scene, thus leaving Opie's wife and two children, Ellie and Kenny, to fend for themselves during his incarceration. Upon his release, Opie's family has difficulty making ends meet, which contributes to Opie's decision to resume illegal activity with SAMCRO, against Donna's wishes. Agent June Stahl attempts to recruit Opie which causes her to trick Clay Morrow, SAMCRO's President, into believing that Opie  betrayed the Club and the others with whom he murdered Heffner
, a port commissioner. Clay responds by ordering Tig Trager to kill Opie and pin it on the One-Niners street gang. Opie's wife, Donna, who was driving his truck, is mistakenly killed instead.

Season 2

After Donna is murdered, Opie spirals into depression. He starts to become more distant from his children, by crashing at the Club house where he bonds with Lyla, a porn star. They later form a relationship together, and Opie wants her to leave the porn industry.

Season 3

When the club starts exploiting its porn connections to entertain Henry Lin's clients, a furious Opie starts a fight with Lin's clients. This ultimately leads to the club losing out on a major deal. He travels to Belfast, Northern Ireland to aide Jax, who's searching for his missing son Abel. After Agent Stahl tries to screw SAMCRO, Opie, with the help of Wayne Unser, targets Agent Stahl in retribution for her role in the death of his wife, Donna. During this confrontation Stahl breaks down crying and begs Opie for her life, to which Opie responds, "This is what she felt." He then shoots Stahl in the back of the head with a MAC-10, instantly killing her. After this, Chibs Telford rigs the scene to look as if the IRA murdered Stahl and Jimmy O'Phelan.

Season 4

Members of SAMCRO are released from prison after serving 14 months for federal weapons charges, due to Stahl's actions. They return to their hometown of Charming, California where they are disturbed by the sight of signs for a new real estate development in their quiet town, spearheaded by the town's new mayor Jacob Hale, Jr. and Elliott Oswald, whose land was seized for the project under eminent domain. On their way into town, they encounter the town's new sheriff, Eli Roosevelt, who together with Assistant U.S. Attorney Lincoln Potter has convened a secret task force to shut down the club's gunrunning operation. Opie and fiancée Lyla get married in a ceremony on an Indian reservation. During the wedding, Jax and Clay kill Russian mob boss Viktor Putlova, while other members seize the Russian's guns and use them to wipe out the rest of the mob. Opie discovers birth control in Lyla's dressing room. Angry that she is sabotaging their attempts to conceive, he sleeps with Ima. Lyla arrives at the clubhouse to find Ima leaving Opie's room. Opie says that he did it because he found her birth control pills, and when she admits to having an abortion, he tells her that he is leaving her until she decides what she wants. Jax lures Ima into her dressing room and throws her against a table, warning her to stay away from his family and the clubhouse.

As the gang votes on the future of Clay's presidency, the clubhouse is attacked by the Lobos Sonora cartel, who drop off the severed heads of two SAMTAZ members, including club president Armando's. One cartel member is captured in the attack, but the Mayans are hit simultaneously, losing three men and a truck full of drugs. Piney demands that Clay withdraw the club from the drug business, threatening to deliver John Teller's letters to the club if he fails. Later that night, Clay arrives at Piney's house and kills him, scrawling the signature of the Lobos Sonora cartel on an old photo of the Sons of Anarchy's founding 'First 9.'

Tig, and Opie turn to Lyla for help locating Georgie Caruso to punish him for inadvertently helping Hale. As they stuff him in the trunk of a car, he admits to sending men after Luann, but only with the intention of roughing her up. Tig and Opie fill his car with bullets. Opie takes the tow truck up to Piney's cabin and finds his father dead. Unser follows him to the cabin and tells him that Clay is the man responsible. Opie's trust in Jax and the club is broken as he seeks revenge. He later arrives at the club and shoots Clay twice. In an attempt to stop Opie, Jax shoots him in the wrist, and takes him to his home, where he stays hidden.

Season 5

Opie rebuffs Jax's offer to sit at the table due to Jax's decision in keeping Clay at the table. Clay visits Opie and convinces him that Jax needs him at the MC. Opie arrives at the clubhouse just as Jax, Tig Trager and Chibs Telford are being arrested for murder. Opie punches the sheriff to ensure he is kept close to Jax. Following a meeting with Damon Pope, Jax has to decide which member of the MC will die in prison. As he is about to sacrifice himself, Opie headbutts the prison guard and is taken to fight to the death. Despite initially putting up a good fight, Opie is outnumbered and eventually overpowered and beaten to death by a prison gang while Jax and Chibs watch on through a window. Jax vows to get revenge against the prison guard for the death of his friend. Opie's wake is held at the clubhouse with every member of SAMCRO in attendance.

Development and reception

Ryan Hurst portrays Opie on Sons of Anarchy. Hurst was promoted to main star billing status starting in season two. Hurst's portrayal of Opie was met with positive reviews.

Opie is killed off in the fifth season episode "Laying Pipe". Hurst has since commented on his characters death, saying: 

Series creator Kurt Sutter said: 

As the series is based on William Shakespeare's Hamlet. Digital Spy questioned if Opie was the character that was based on Ophelia, saying: Our favourite Ophelia choice is probably Opie, if only because of the remarkable similarities between their names. Jax's childhood friend is certainly put through the ringer, although his death falls into the 'noble sacrifice' category rather than Ophelia's famous suicide.

References

Sons of Anarchy characters
Fictional career criminals
Fictional gang members
Fictional gangsters
Fictional murdered people
Fictional murderers
Television characters introduced in 2008